.gf is the country code top-level domain (ccTLD) for French Guiana.  It is delegated to the ISP Canal+ Telecom.

See also
 Internet in France
 ISO 3166-2:GF
 .fr –CC TLD for France
 .eu –CC TLD for the European Union

External links
 IANA .gf whois information
 .gf domain registration website

1996 establishments in France
Communications in French Guiana
Country code top-level domains
Internet in France
Internet properties established in 1996

sv:Toppdomän#G